Epanalepsis (from the Greek , epanálēpsis "repetition, resumption, taking up again") is the repetition of the initial part of a clause or sentence at the end of that same clause or sentence. The beginning and the end of a sentence are two positions of emphasis, so special attention is placed on the phrase by repeating it in both places. Nested double-epanalepses are antimetaboles.

Examples
 The king is dead; long live the king!
 History is ours and people make history. — Salvador Allende
 They bowed down to him rather, because he was all of these things, and then again he was all of these things because the town bowed down. —Zora Neale Hurston, Their Eyes Were Watching God
 Beloved is mine; she is Beloved. — Toni Morrison, Beloved
 Blow winds and crack your cheeks! Rage, blow! — Shakespeare, King Lear, 3.2.1
 Once more unto the breach, dear friends, once more; — Shakespeare, Henry V, 3.1.1
 Last things first; the slow haul to forgive them ... a telling figure out of rhetoric, | epanalepsis, the same word first and last. — Geoffrey Hill, The Triumph of Love, Section X
 Nice to see you, to see you, nice. — Bruce Forsyth (As a phrase repeated but inverted, this is also an example of antimetabole.)

See also 
 Anaphora (rhetoric)
 Anadiplosis
 Figure of speech

Footnotes

External links
 Audio illustrations of epanalepsis

Figures of speech
Rhetoric